Nasser Maher Abdelhamid Abdelhamid Elnouhi (born 8 February 1997) is an Egyptian professional footballer who plays as a forward for Egyptian League club from Al Ahly.

Honours
Al Ahly
 Egyptian Premier League: 2015–16 , 2018–19
 Egypt Cup: 2019–20

Egypt
Africa U-23 Cup of Nations Champions: 2019

References

1998 births
Living people
Egyptian footballers
Association football midfielders
Al Ahly SC players
Petrojet SC players
Smouha SC players
Footballers at the 2020 Summer Olympics
Olympic footballers of Egypt
People from Mansoura, Egypt
Future FC (Egypt) players